The Winter Sports School in Park City  is a college preparatory public charter school, with students from 9th through 12th grades, located in Park City, Utah.

General information
The Winter Sports School was founded in 1994 by a group of parents whose children were dedicated students and elite winter sports athletes.  Because winter sports disciplines require considerable travel from venue to venue, and because the training and competition schedules during the winter – and during the heart of the traditional academic calendar in the United States – are so intense, the founding parents were determined to find an alternate way to allow the students to focus on their athletics during the winter season and on their academics during the remainder of the year.  The school was developed around that concept, and its academic calendar therefore begins in mid-April and ends in mid-November.

The Winter Sports School's new campus is located next to the Matt Knoop Memorial Park in Park City, Utah.  Their campus is also within an hour's drive of the 2002 Olympic venues in all other winter sports disciplines and a forty-minute drive from the Salt Lake International Airport.

Academics
The Winter Sports School's academic program is centered on preparing its students for college. Over 90% of The Winter Sports School's students go on to college after graduation – most attend NCAA member schools with a strong presence in winter sports. Students from the last several graduating classes have attended such institutions as Bates College, Colby College, Dartmouth College, Middlebury College, Stanford University, University of California at Berkeley, University of Utah, Westminster College, and Williams College.

Accreditation
The Winter Sports School is accredited by the Pacific Northwest Association of Independent Schools (PNAIS) and the Northwest Association of Accredited Schools (NAAS).

Athletics
The Winter Sports School is notable and unique from other ski and sports academy in the United States in that their coaching staff provides group summer conditioning only – the students do not compete as school teams during the winter competitive season itself.  Instead the students are free during the winter season to work with whichever coaches in the world they may choose.  Despite the school's small size and a total alumni base of around 200, a higher percentage of its graduates go on to compete on the national and world stage than from any other secondary school in the United States.  Approximately 20% of the U.S. Ski Team is Winter Sports School alumni.

Six Winter Sports School alumni competed in the 2006 Winter Olympics, in Torino, Italy, and two (Julia Mancuso ’00 and Ted Ligety ’02) won gold medals – the only two gold medals captured by the entire U.S. Ski Team during those games.  Ligety also won the World Cup Giant Slalom title in 2008, 2010 and 2011.

Seven Winter Sports School alumni competed in the 2010 Winter Olympics in Vancouver, B.C.  Julia Mancuso '00 won silver medals in the women's downhill and women's super combined.  Andrew Weibrecht '03 won the bronze medal in men's super-G.  Steve Holcomb '97 led the four-man US bobsled team to a gold medal victory.

The 2011 Winter X Games saw Alex Schlopy '09 take the gold medal in the men's Skiing Big Air event. Ashley Battersby '05 finished in fourth place in women's Slopestyle.

In the 2011 FIS Freestyle Skiing World Championships Alex Schlopy took the gold medal in the men's Slopestyle event. Ashley Battersby took sixth in women's Slopestyle.

In the 2013 FIS Nordic World Ski Championships, Sarah Hendrickson '12 won gold in the women's ski jumping competition.

External links

References

 Winter Sports School Profile at NBC Affiliate KSL.com
 Winter Sports School Listing at PNAIS

Education in Summit County, Utah
Public high schools in Utah